Filip Riska (born 13 May 1985) is a Finnish professional ice hockey player currently playing for Sport of the Finnish Liiga.

References

External links

1985 births
JYP Jyväskylä players
Living people
Finnish ice hockey forwards
Lukko players
People from Jakobstad
Sportspeople from Ostrobothnia (region)